Cambridge High School may refer to:

In the United States 
Cambridge High School (Georgia) in Milton, Georgia
Cambridge High School (Idaho) in Cambridge, Idaho 
Cambridge High School (Illinois) in Cambridge, Illinois
Cambridge Rindge and Latin School in Cambridge, Massachusetts
Cambridge High School (Michigan) in Garden City, Michigan
Cambridge High School (Nebraska) in Cambridge, Nebraska
Cambridge High School (Cambridge, Ohio) in Cambridge, Ohio
Cambridge High School (Wisconsin) in Cambridge, Wisconsin 
Cambridge-Isanti High School in Cambridge, Minnesota

Elsewhere 
Cambridge High School, Jamaica in Jamaica
Cambridge High School (Jordan) in Amman, Jordan
Cambridge High School, New Zealand in Cambridge, New Zealand
Cambridge High School, East London, South Africa
Cambridge High School, (Abu Dhabi) in Abu Dhabi, UAE

See also 
The Cambridge School (disambiguation)